Nadia Sher Khan is a Pakistani politician who had been a Member of the Provincial Assembly of Khyber Pakhtunkhwa from May 2013 to May 2018.

Education
She has received matriculation level education.

Political career

She was elected to the Provincial Assembly of Khyber Pakhtunkhwa as a candidate of Pakistan Tehreek-e-Insaf (PTI) on a reserved seat for women in 2013 Pakistani general election. In September 2013, she was made Parliamentary Secretary of Khyber Pakhtunkhwa Assembly for Population Welfare.

In May 2016, Sher joined a resolution to establish a Women's Caucus in the Provincial Assembly of Khyber Pakhtunkhwa.

She was re-elected to the Provincial Assembly of Khyber Pakhtunkhwa as a candidate of PTI on a reserved seat for women in 2018 Pakistani general election.

References

Living people
21st-century Pakistani women politicians
Pakistan Tehreek-e-Insaf MPAs (Khyber Pakhtunkhwa)
Women members of the Provincial Assembly of Khyber Pakhtunkhwa
Year of birth missing (living people)